In matrix calculus, Jacobi's formula expresses the derivative of the determinant of a matrix A in terms of the adjugate of A and the derivative of A.

If  is a differentiable map from the real numbers to  matrices, then

where  is the trace of the matrix .  (The latter equality only holds if A(t) is invertible.) 

As a special case,

The formula is named after the mathematician Carl Gustav Jacob Jacobi.

Derivation

Via Matrix Computation
We first prove a preliminary lemma:

Lemma.  Let A and B be a pair of square matrices of the same dimension n. Then

Proof. The product AB of the pair of matrices has components

Replacing the matrix A by its transpose AT is equivalent to permuting the indices of its components:

The result follows by taking the trace of both sides:

Theorem. (Jacobi's formula) For any differentiable map A from the real numbers to n × n matrices,

 

Proof. Laplace's formula for the determinant of a matrix A can be stated as

Notice that the summation is performed over some arbitrary row i of the matrix.

The determinant of A can be considered to be a function of the elements of A:

so that, by the chain rule, its differential is

This summation is performed over all n×n elements of the matrix.

To find ∂F/∂Aij consider that on the right hand side of Laplace's formula, the index i can be chosen at will. (In order to optimize calculations: Any other choice would eventually yield the same result, but it could be much harder).  In particular, it can be chosen to match the first index of ∂ / ∂Aij:

Thus, by the product rule,

Now, if an element of a matrix Aij and a cofactor adjT(A)ik of element Aik lie on the same row (or column), then the cofactor will not be a function of Aij, because the cofactor of Aik is expressed in terms of elements not in its own row (nor column).  Thus,

so

All the elements of A are independent of each other, i.e.

where δ is the Kronecker delta, so

Therefore,

and applying the Lemma yields

Via Chain Rule
Lemma 1.

The differential  is a linear operator that maps an n × n matrix to a real number.

Proof. Using the definition of a directional derivative together with one of its basic properties for differentiable functions, we have

Lemma 2. For an invertible matrix A, we have: .

Proof. Consider the following function of X:

Theorem. (Jacobi's formula) 

Proof. If  is invertible, by Lemma 2, with 

Now, the formula holds for all matrices, since the set of invertible linear matrices is dense in the space of matrices.

Corollary
The following is a useful relation connecting the trace to the determinant of the associated matrix exponential:

This statement is clear for diagonal matrices, and a proof of the general claim follows.

For any invertible matrix , in the previous section "Via Chain Rule", we showed that

Considering  in this equation yields:

 

The desired result follows as the solution to this ordinary differential equation.

Applications
Several forms of the formula underlie the Faddeev–LeVerrier algorithm for computing the characteristic polynomial, and explicit applications of the Cayley–Hamilton theorem. For example, starting from the following equation, which was proved above:

and using , we get:

where adj denotes the adjugate matrix.

Remarks

References
 
 

Determinants
Matrix theory
Articles containing proofs